Equiti (formerly First Gulf Bank, First Abu Dhabi Bank and, Umm Al Sheif) is a rapid transit station on the Red Line of the Dubai Metro in Dubai, UAE, serving Al Quoz and surrounding areas. The station was named after the nearby Umm Al Sheif locality.

The station opened as part of the Red Line on 15 October 2010. Former names include "First Gulf Bank" and then "First Abu Dhabi Bank" on September 21, 2017, before it was renamed as "Umm Al Sheif" on November 24, 2020. Most recently it has been renamed "Equiti" on 18 April 2022, after the Equiti Group, for a period of ten years until 2032.

Equiti station is located on the Sheikh Zayed Road near the major junction with Umm Suqeim Street. Nearby is the Gold and Diamond Park, immediately adjacent to the station, including the Old Library building. As well as Al Quoz, surrounding neighbourhoods include the eponymous Umm Al Sheif itself and Umm Suqeim. The station is close to a number of bus routes.

See also
 First Gulf Bank
 First Abu Dhabi Bank
 Umm Al Sheif

References

Railway stations in the United Arab Emirates opened in 2010
Dubai Metro stations